Another Side is the only studio album by American house music group Fingers Inc., released on Jack Trax in 1988. It is the first full-length house music album. "Can You Feel It" peaked at number 78 on the UK Singles Chart. The album was reissued by P-Vine Records in 2014 and by Alleviated Records in 2015.

Critical reception

John Bush of AllMusic gave the album 4.5 out of 5 stars, calling it "an unabashed house classic." Andy Beta of Pitchfork gave the album an 8.8 out of 10, describing it as "a beacon of American dance music" and a pioneering work of the deep house style.

Track listing

Personnel
Credits adapted from liner notes.

 Fingers Inc. – arrangement (except 2, 4, 6)
 Larry Heard – arrangement (2, 4, 6), keyboards, keyboard programming, drum programming, background vocals, production, mixing
 Robert Owens – lead vocals, background vocals, additional mixing assistance
 Ron Wilson – lead vocals, background vocals
 Harri Dennis – additional vocals (9)
 Mike Konopka – engineering, mixing
 Tommy White – engineering

References

External links
 

1988 debut albums
Fingers Inc. albums